Persikubar Putra is an Indonesian football club based in Sendawar, West Kutai Regency. They currently compete in Liga 3.

Persikubar Putra is an phoenix club of Persikubar West Kutai after the original club was moved their homebase and changed the name to Persebaya DU in 2010, and now the club known as Bhayangkara FC.

References

External links
 

West Kutai Regency
Football clubs in East Kalimantan
Football clubs in Indonesia
Association football clubs established in 2021
2021 establishments in Indonesia
Phoenix clubs (association football)